Tetragonoderus bivittatus is a species of beetle in the family Carabidae. It was described by Jeannel in 1949.

References

bivittatus
Beetles described in 1949